Allamakee County is the northeasternmost county in the U.S. state of Iowa. As of the 2020 census, the population was 14,061. Its county seat is Waukon.

History
Allamakee County was formed on February 20, 1847. The derivation of the name is debated, some believing it was the name of an Indian chief, others think it was named for Allen Magee, an early historic trader.   The first Allamakee County Courthouse in Waukon, built in 1861, now serves as the Allamakee County Historical Museum. The present Allamakee County Court House was built in 1940. Both courthouse buildings are listed on the National Register of Historic Places.

Geography

In the northern part of the county is the Upper Iowa River. In the southern part is the Yellow River. The eastern boundary is the Mississippi River. All offer scenic and recreational opportunities, particularly in Yellow River State Forest.

French Creek flows north of Waukon, outside the city limits. Paint Creek, named after Paint Rock Bluff, flows out of the south of Waukon. Norfolk creek originates in the western outskirts of Waukon and is effluent to the Yellow River. Clear Creek flows into Lansing. Village Creek flows through essentially rural terrain. All are tributary to the Mississippi River.

The landforms encountered in the county are very unlike those found in most of Iowa, which is mostly absent Glacial Drift. As part of the Driftless Area, the county was ice free during the last ice age, and as one progresses to the Mississippi River, the streams and rivers display high-walled canyons carved of Silurian period bedrock. This Driftless Area also includes parts of Clayton, Fayette, Winneshiek, Howard, Dubuque, and Jackson Counties.

Major highways
 U.S. Highway 18
 U.S. Highway 52
 Iowa Highway 9
 Iowa Highway 26
 Iowa Highway 51
 Iowa Highway 76

Adjacent counties
Houston County, Minnesota  (north)
Vernon County, Wisconsin  (northeast)
Crawford County, Wisconsin  (east)
Clayton County  (south)
Winneshiek County  (west)
Fayette County  (southwest)

Demographics

2020 census
There were 7,668 housing units of which 5,797 were occupied.

2010 census
There were 7,617 housing units, of which 5,845 were occupied.

2000 census

As of the census of 2000, there were 14,675 people, 5,722 households, and 3,931 families residing in the county.  The population density was 23 people per square mile (9/km2).  There were 7,142 housing units at an average density of 11 per square mile (4/km2).  The racial makeup of the county was 95.88% White, 0.14% Black or African American, 0.18% Native American, 0.27% Asian, 0.01% Pacific Islander, 2.82% from other races, and 0.70% from two or more races.  3.54% of the population were Hispanic or Latino of any race.

There were 5,722 households, out of which 30.60% had children under the age of 18 living with them, 58.40% were married couples living together, 6.60% had a female householder with no husband present, and 31.30% were non-families. 27.50% of all households were made up of individuals, and 14.30% had someone living alone who was 65 years of age or older.  The average household size was 2.49 and the average family size was 3.02.

In the county, the population was spread out, with 25.40% under the age of 18, 7.00% from 18 to 24, 25.60% from 25 to 44, 23.60% from 45 to 64, and 18.40% who were 65 years of age or older.  The median age was 40 years. For every 100 females there were 100.20 males.  For every 100 females age 18 and over, there were 98.90 males.

The median income for a household in the county was $33,967, and the median income for a family was $40,589. Males had a median income of $26,122 versus $19,098 for females. The per capita income for the county was $16,599.  About 6.40% of families and 9.60% of the population were below the poverty line, including 11.80% of those under age 18 and 8.10% of those age 65 or over.

Notable sites
 
Effigy Mounds National Monument is found in the southeast corner of the county.
Upper Mississippi River National Wildlife and Fish Refuge encompasses the River.
Driftless Area National Wildlife Refuge, a collection of small, non-contiguous parcels harboring two endangered species.
Yellow River State Forest is a four-season state park.

Media
The Waukon Standard
The Postville Herald-Leader

Communities

Cities
Harpers Ferry
Lansing
New Albin
Postville (part)
Waterville
Waukon

Townships
Allamakee County is divided into eighteen townships:

 Center
 Fairview
 Franklin
 French Creek
 Hanover
 Iowa
 Jefferson
 Lafayette
 Lansing
 Linton
 Ludlow
 Makee
 Paint Creek
 Post
 Taylor
 Union City
 Union Prairie
 Waterloo

Unincorporated communities
Church
Dorchester
Ludlow
Lycurgus
Rossville
Volney

Ghost towns
Columbus
Hardin
Ion
Myron
Village Creek

Population ranking
The population ranking of the following table is based on the 2020 census of Allamakee County.

† county seat

Politics

See also

Cota Creek
Duck Lake (Iowa)
National Register of Historic Places listings in Allamakee County, Iowa
Allamakee County Court House
The former Allamakee County Courthouse, now a museum

References

Further reading 

 
 

External links

Allamakee County Information
Allamakee County Official Site
Allamakee County Map
Allamakee County Health and Demographic Data
Waukon Standard (Newspaper)
KNEI/KHPP Radio
Allamakee County History Website

 
1847 establishments in Iowa
Iowa placenames of Native American origin
Driftless Area
Iowa counties on the Mississippi River
Populated places established in 1847